Cyclopentanol or cyclopentyl alcohol is a cyclic alcohol.  It is also known as hydroxycyclopentane.

Reactions
The dehydration of cyclopentanol produces cyclopentene:

C5H10O → C5H8 + H2O

References

Cycloalkanols
Cyclopentyl compounds
Cyclopentanols